Hines may refer to:

Places in the United States

Hines, Florida, an unincorporated community in Dixie County
Hines, Illinois, an unincorporated community
Hines, Minnesota, an unincorporated community
Hines Township, Beltrami County, Minnesota
Hines, Oregon, a city
Hines, West Virginia, an unincorporated community
Hines, Wisconsin, an unincorporated community

People
Hines (name), a list of people with the surname or given name

Other 
Hines Interests Limited Partnership, an international real estate company

See also
Edward Hines, Jr., Veterans Administration Hospital
Hines College of Architecture at the University of Houston
Hines' Raid, U.S. Confederate exploratory mission
Ulmus americana 'Hines', elm cultivar
Hynes
Himes
Justice Hines (disambiguation)
 Hine (TV series), 1971 British television series